São Miguel (Portuguese for Saint Michael) is the name of the largest island of the Azores and may also refer to:

Places

Brazil
 São Miguel, Rio Grande do Norte, a municipality in the State of Rio Grande do Norte
 Barra de São Miguel, Alagoas, a municipality in the State of Alagoas
 Barra de São Miguel, Paraíba, a municipality in the State of Paraíba
 São Miguel do Aleixo, a municipality in the State of Sergipe
 São Miguel do Anta, a municipality in the State of Mina Gerais
 São Miguel do Araguaia, a municipality in the State of Goiás
 São Miguel Arcanjo, Brazil, a municipality in the State of São Paulo
 São Miguel da Baixa Grande, a municipality in the State of Piauí
 São Miguel da Boa Vista, a municipality in the State of Santa Catarina
 São Miguel dos Campos, a municipality in the State of Alagoas
 São Miguel do Fidalgo, a municipality in the State of Piauí
 São Miguel do Gostoso, a municipality in the State of Rio Grande do Norte
 São Miguel do Guamá, a municipality in the State of Pará
 São Miguel do Guaporé, a municipality in the State of Rondônia
 São Miguel do Iguaçu, a municipality in the State of Paraná
 São Miguel das Matas, a municipality in the State of Bahia
 São Miguel dos Milagres, a municipality in the State of Alagoas
 São Miguel das Missões (city), a town in the State of Rio Grande do Sul

 São Miguel das Missões, a Jesuit Mission and UNESCO Heritage Site near the city of the same name
 São Miguel do Oeste, a municipality in the State of Santa Catarina
 São Miguel do Passa Quatro, a municipality in the State of Goiás
 Subprefecture of São Miguel Paulista, São Paulo
 São Miguel Paulista (district of São Paulo), a district in the subprefecture of the same name in the city of São Paulo, Brazil
 São Miguel de Taipu, a municipality in the State of Paraíba
 São Miguel do Tapuio, a municipality in the State of Piauí
 São Miguel do Tocantins, a municipality in the State of Tocantins

Cape Verde
 São Miguel, Cape Verde, a municipality on the island of Santiago

Portugal
 São Miguel do Mato (Arouca), a civil parish in the municipality of Arouca
 São Miguel do Rio Torto, a civil parish in the municipality of Abrantes
 Sobral de São Miguel, a civil parish in the municipality of Covilhã
 São Miguel (Lisbon), a civil parish in the municipality of Lisbon
 São Miguel (Penela), a civil parish in the municipality of Penela
 São Miguel do Mato (Vouzela), a civil parish in the municipality of Vouzela
 An alternative name for the civil parish of Vilar de Perdizes in the municipality of Montalegre

In the archipelago of the Azores
 São Miguel Island, located in the Eastern Group, and largest island
 São Miguel (Vila Franca do Campo), a civil parish in the municipality of Vila Franca do Campo, island of São Miguel

Other
 The carrack Bérrio, part of the Portuguese explorer, Vasco da Gama's fleet